6-Hydroxyflavone is a flavone, a type of chemical compound. It is one of the noncompetitive inhibitors of cytochrome P450 2C9. It is reported in Crocus and leaves of Barleria prionitis Linn. (a common Acanthaceae from India).
6-Hydroxyflavone may have a potential as a therapeutic drug capable for the treatment of anxiety-like disorders.

References

External links 
 6-hydroxy flavone on Plant Metabolic Network

Flavones
Steroid sulfotransferase inhibitors